Max Kolu (born July 7, 1983 in Turku, Finland) is a Finnish professional ice hockey player. He is currently playing for TPS Turku of the SM-liiga.

Playing career
Kolu started his professional career playing college hockey in 2003-04. There he played for Clarkson University. After three seasons, he returned to Finland to play for SM-liiga team TPS. Kolu is a hard hitter, and is especially known for his good work rate. In TPS, he has become one of the biggest fan favourites.

Career statistics

External links
 

1983 births
Arizona Coyotes scouts
Clarkson Golden Knights men's ice hockey players
Finnish ice hockey defencemen
HC TPS players
Living people
Sportspeople from Turku